The Sail River is a stream on the Olympic Peninsula in the U.S. state of Washington. It originates in the northern Olympic Mountains and flows north, emptying into the Strait of Juan de Fuca.

Course
The Sail River originates in the northwestern portion of Olympic Peninsula. It flows north through the Makah Reservation, entering the Strait of Juan de Fuca about a mile east of Neah Bay.

See also
 List of rivers of Washington

References

Rivers of Washington (state)
Rivers of Clallam County, Washington